Sharon Rudahl (born 1947) is an American comic artist, illustrator and writer. She was one of the first female artists who contributed to the underground comix movement of the early 1970's. In 1972, she was part of the women's collective that founded Wimmen's Comix, the first on-going comic drawn exclusively by women.

Biography 
Sharon Rudahl was born in 1947. She grew up in Washington D.C., Virginia and Maryland and has lived in Madison, Wisconsin and San Francisco, California. She became aware of social inequalities at an early age both through racism she observed against African Americans and the segregation she experienced growing up as a Jewish American. In her teens, she began participating in civil rights marches. The focus of her career is social and political activism, primarily through the genre of comics. Early in her career, she contributed to several political publications including the underground paper Kaleidoscope, Takeover, and the San Francisco Express Times (previously named Good Times). She was also the art editor at Takeover during the 1970's.

In the early 1970's, Rudahl was one of the founders of the feminist wing of the underground comix movement. In response to the boy's club nature of the underground comix scene of the early 1970's, she joined the woman's collective that founded Wimmen's Comix, the first ongoing publication drawn exclusively by women. During the underground comix era, her work was featured in Anarchy Comix, Comix Book (Marvel), Wimmen’s Comix, Tits & Clits Comix, and Rip Off Comix.

In 1980, Rudahl wrote her first comic book, Adventures of Crystal Night, which was later reprinted in Art in Time (2010).  

She has written and illustrated two graphic novel biographies, both featuring political activists. The first, A Dangerous Woman: The Graphic Biography of Emma Goldman (2007), explores the life of anarchist political activist and writer Emma Goldman. The second, Ballad of an American: A Graphic Biography of Paul Robeson (2020), is about the life of black activist Paul Robeson.

Rudahl has also contributed to several non-fiction graphic anthologies edited by Paul Buhle, including Wobblies!: A Graphic History of the Industrial Workers of the World (co-edited by Nicole Schulman, 2005), Studs Terkel’s Working: A Graphic Adaptation (adapted by Harvey Pekar, edited by Buhle, 2009), Robin Hood: People's Outlaw and Forest Hero, A Graphic Guide (2011), Yiddishkeit: Jewish Vernacular and the New Land (co-edited with Harvey Pekar, 2011) and Bohemians: A Graphic History (co-edited by David Berger, 2014).

“I made the invaluable discovery that anyone can be powerful if they are indifferent to consequences.”

― Sharon Rudahl, A Dangerous Woman: The Graphic Biography of Emma Goldman

Selected bibliography 
 Ballad of an American: A Graphic Biography of Paul Robeson (Rutgers University Press, 2020) - writer and illustrator
 Bohemians: A Graphic History (Verso Books, 2014) - contributor
 Yiddishkeit: Jewish Vernacular and the New Land (Abrams Comicarts, 2011) - contributor
 Robin Hood: People's Outlaw and Forest Hero, A Graphic Guide (PM Press, 2011) - illustrator /contributor
 StudsTerkel’s Working: A Graphic Adaptation (The New Press, 2009) - contributor
 A Dangerous Woman: The Graphic Biography of Emma Goldman (The New Press, 2007) - writer and illustrator
 Wobblies!: A Graphic History of the Industrial Workers of the World  (Verso Books, 2005)
 Adventures of Crystal Night (Kitchen Sink Press, 1980) - writer and artist
 Anarchy Comix #3 (Last Gasp, 1981)
 Tits & Clits #6 (Nanny Goat Productions / Last Gasp, 1980) - contributor 
 Tits & Clits #5 (Nanny Goat Productions / Last Gasp, 1979) - contributor
 Anarchy Comix #2 (Last Gasp, 1979)
 Wimmen's Comix #1 (Last Gasp, 1972)—founding member and contributor

References 

1947 births
Living people
American women cartoonists
American cartoonists
American female comics artists
American political activists
American women illustrators
American graphic novelists
Underground cartoonists
Jewish women artists
Jewish American artists
21st-century American Jews
21st-century American women